Germany competed at the 1991 World Championships in Athletics in Tokyo, Japan, from 23 August to 1 September 1991. The German Athletics Association nominated 91 athletes.

Medalists

Results

Men
Track and road events

Field events

Combined events – Decathlon

Women
Track and road events

Field events

Combined events – Heptathlon

References

Nations at the 1991 World Championships in Athletics
World Championships in Athletics
Germany at the World Championships in Athletics